The 1995 Intercontinental Cup was an association football match played on 28 November 1995 between Ajax, winners of the 1994–95 UEFA Champions League, and Grêmio, winners of the 1995 Copa Libertadores. The match was played at the National Stadium in Tokyo. It was Ajax's second appearance into the competition, after the victory in 1972; moreover, Ajax declined to play in 1971 and 1973, being replaced by Panathinaikos and Juventus respectively. It was Grêmio's second appearance as well, after the victory in 1983.

Danny Blind was named as man of the match.

Venue

Match details

Man of the Match:
 Danny Blind (Ajax)

Match Ball
The Ball of the match was the Adidas Questra, originally designed to be the official match ball of the 1994 FIFA World Cup in the United States.

See also
1994–95 UEFA Champions League
1995 Copa Libertadores
1995–96 AFC Ajax season
AFC Ajax in European football

References

Intercontinental Cup
Intercontinental Cup
Intercontinental Cup
Intercontinental Cup (football)
Intercontinental Cup 1995
Intercontinental Cup 1995
Intercontinental Cup 1995
Intercontinental Cup (football) matches hosted by Japan
Inter
November 1995 sports events in Asia
Sports competitions in Tokyo
1995 in Tokyo
1995 in association football